Award for Valor may refer to one of the following awards of the United States Government:

 State Department Award for Valor
 Secretary of the Army Award for Valor
 Secretary of Defense Medal for Valor